Aethes amurensis is a species of moth of the family Tortricidae. It is found in Russia (Amur Oblast), China (Beijing, Gansu, Guizhou, Hebei, Heilongjiang, Henan, Jilin, Liaoning, Ningxia, Qinghai, Shaanxi, Shanxi) and Korea.

References

Moths described in 1964
amurensis
Moths of Asia